The 1952 Quebec general election was held on July 16, 1952, to elect members of the Legislative Assembly of the Province of Quebec, Canada.  The incumbent Union Nationale, led by Maurice Duplessis, won re-election, defeating the Quebec Liberal Party, led by Georges-Émile Lapalme.

This was the fourth time (and the third in a row) that Duplessis led his party to a general election victory.

The number of seats won by the Liberals, and their share of the popular vote, were considerably increased over the previous election in 1948.

Results

Note:

1 including results of Union des Électeurs from previous election.

See also
 List of Quebec premiers
 Politics of Quebec
 Timeline of Quebec history
 List of Quebec political parties
 24th Legislative Assembly of Quebec

Quebec general election
Elections in Quebec
General election
Quebec general election